Stéphane Robinet (born May 2, 1983) is a footballer currently playing for Championnat National side Paris FC as a striker. He signed for Paris on June 11, 2009.

References

External links
Stéphane Robinet profile at chamoisfc79.fr

1983 births
Living people
French footballers
Association football forwards
Chamois Niortais F.C. players
AS Cherbourg Football players
Paris FC players
Ligue 2 players
US Raon-l'Étape players